Sheeba is an Indian actress who predominantly appears in Hindi language films.

Life and career
Sheeba has acted in Hindi films primarily. She married filmmaker Akashdeep in 1996; he directed her in films like Ghaath and Miss 420. She and her husband Akashdeep made a comeback as producers from TV show Bhoot Aaya.

Filmography
Hum Baja Bajaa Denge (2015)

Dum (2003)
Basti (2003)

500 Ka Note (2002)
Meri Partigya (2002)
Ek Aur Jung (2001)

Bhootni  (2000)
Ghaath (2000)
Jwalamukhi (2000) (Item song)
Kaala Samrajya (1999)
Miss 420 (1998)
Ajnabi Saaya (1998)
Jeeo Shaan Se (1997)
Kaalia (1997)
Share Bazaar (1997)
Lahu Ke Do Rang (1997) (Item song)
Ravan Raaj: A True Story (1995)
Surakshaa (1995)
King Soloman (1995) (Malayalam film)
Sanam Teri Kasam (1994)
Teesra Kaun (1994) (Item song)
Pyar Ka Rog (1994)
Hum Hain Kamaal Ke (1993)
Boyfriend (1993)
Aasmaan Se Gira (1992)
Suryavanshi (1992)
Mr. Bond (1992)
Pyaar Ka Saaya (1991)
Baarish (1991)
Nachnewale Gaanewale (1991)
Yeh Aag Kab Bujhegi (1991)
Athisaya Piravi (1990) Debut movie (Tamil)

Television

References

External links

Actresses in Hindi cinema
Living people
Female models from Mumbai
21st-century Indian actresses
Indian film actresses
Actresses from Mumbai
Year of birth missing (living people)